Gurak, Iran is a village in Fars Province, Iran.

Gurak may also refer to:
Gurak-e Dezhgah
Gurak-e Do
Gurak-e Kalleh Bandi
Gurak-e Khvorshidi
Gurak-e Mohammad Rahimi
Gurak-e Sadat
Gurak-e Soleymani

See also
Ghurak, Iran (disambiguation)